Growing out of a grassroots primary care revitalization effort launched at Harvard Medical School, Intend Health Strategies was founded as Primary Care Progress (PCP) in 2010. Since then, Intend Health Strategies has transformed from an alliance of medical school-based teams promoting primary care into a national movement — a powerful learning collaborative of current and future healthcare professionals from across disciplines and career stages.

The work of Intend Health Strategies is grounded in Relational Leadership (RL), a human-centered approach to working with others that cultivates connection and awareness to increase belonging, collaboration, equity, and impact across health systems.

Each year, Intend Health Strategies supports more than 2,500 healthcare professionals in developing skills that re-energize and empower authentic human connection. We know that this is the foundation for better care and for catalyzing meaningful and sustainable change in the individual, the team, and the overall healthcare system. We work with academic medical centers, health systems, hospitals, and community health centers across the country to help individuals and teams achieve their full potential and effectively navigate change.

Initial Media Coverage 
In 2010, PCP president and co-founder Dr. Andrew Morris-Singer discussed on CNN the crisis in primary care and what is being done to address it. PCP’s role in the creation of Harvard Medical School’s Center for Primary Care, which included a series of town hall meetings with hundreds of attendees, was described in a Harvard Gazette article.

In 2011, PCP was featured in the American College of Physicians’ Impact Newsletter as a “new national organization dedicated to engaging local communities to promote primary care, innovate in care delivery and prepare the next generation of leaders in primary care” by “building a grassroots network of advocates who share the vision of a health care system built on a robust foundation of primary care.”

In 2012, President Morris-Singer wrote a blog post for KevinMD.com calling for a primary care “workforce surge,” and another for the Health Care Blog on revitalizing the primary care training “pipeline” through a multifaceted approach to overcome the financial, academic, cultural and political challenges. He was also featured in a New York Times article on initiatives encouraging students to consider primary care careers.

Representing PCP, in 2013 Dr. Morris-Singer was a panelist for a Congressional briefing on primary care. PCP was also featured in 2013 articles on the primary care crisis by the Associated Press and the Association of Health Care Journalists.

In 2014, MedPage Today published a piece about Primary Care Progress’ grassroots efforts, while the Atlantic’s story “Why I’m Becoming a Primary Care Doctor” included insight from President Morris-Singer on the stigmatization of primary care careers.

New England Public Radio highlighted the work of PCP in two 2015 pieces about the future of primary care.

Publications 
In a September, 2022 Health Affairs Forefront article, Intend Health partners Kari Mader, Sarah Smithson, and Matt Lewis write that for the best patient outcomes our system must locate primary care at the center of patient care. The authors call on health systems and providers to use the experience of the COVID-19 pandemic to inform a new model of primary care that is based on relationships.

In a May, 2022 STAT article, Intend Health Founder Andrew Morris-Singer and Intend Health CEO Brian Souza detail how the US healthcare system is facing its own Dunkirk moment. Without a swift and bold rescue operation, the ranks of America's healthcare workers will quickly dwindle, diminishing the ability to provide care in both outpatient and hospital settings.

In a March, 2022 Women in White Coats article, Kim Nichols offers five simple strategies rooted in diversity, equity, and inclusion to improve the culture of healthcare organizations.

References

External links 

Medical and health organizations based in Massachusetts
Healthcare reform in the United States
General practice organizations
Health care education